The 2023 Louisiana gubernatorial election will take place on October 14, 2023, to elect the next governor of Louisiana. Incumbent Democratic Governor John Bel Edwards is term-limited and cannot seek re-election to a third consecutive term in office.

Under Louisiana's jungle primary system, all candidates will appear on the same ballot, regardless of party, and voters may vote for any candidate, regardless of their party affiliation.

Background 
Louisiana, like much of the Deep South, is a very socially conservative state. Democrats were the favored party at all levels of government as recently as the 1990s, however the Republican Party has since rapidly gained ground, first at the federal level and gradually at the state and local level as well. By the mid-2010s, Republicans had taken control of both of the state's U.S. Senate seats, all but one of its U.S. House seats, both chambers of the state legislature and almost every statewide office.

John Bel Edwards, a conservative Democrat, was able to win two terms as governor and overcome the state's partisan lean by diverging from the national party on certain policy matters (particularly abortion, as one of the few remaining influential pro-life Democrats) and concurrently successfully appealing to Louisiana's traditional Democratic voting base.

Nonetheless, most analysts expect the governorship to flip back to the Republican Party in 2023, primarily due to the dearth of Democratic candidates with Edwards' crossover appeal.

Democratic candidates

Declared
Danny Cole, pastor
Shawn Wilson, former Secretary of the Louisiana Department of Transportation and Development

Publicly expressed interest
Gary Smith Jr., state senator from the 19th district

Potential
LaToya Cantrell, Mayor of New Orleans
Joel Chaisson, St. Charles Parish District Attorney
Mitch Landrieu, Senior Advisor to the President, former Mayor of New Orleans, and former Lieutenant Governor of Louisiana
AP Marullo, real estate developer
Luke Mixon, pilot, U.S. Navy veteran, and candidate for U.S. Senate in 2022
Sharon Weston Broome, Mayor of Baton Rouge

Declined
Katie Bernhardt, chair of the Louisiana Democratic Party
Hillar Moore, East Baton Rouge Parish District Attorney
Cedric Richmond, former Director of the Office of Public Engagement, former Senior Advisor to the President, and former U.S. Representative from

Republican candidates

Declared 
Sharon Hewitt, Majority Leader of the Louisiana Senate from the 1st district
Xan John, businessman and Independent candidate for U.S. Senate in 2020 and 2022
Jeff Landry, Louisiana Attorney General
Richard Nelson, state representative from the 89th district
John Schroder, Louisiana State Treasurer
Stephen Waguespack, former president and CEO of the Louisiana Association of Business and Industry and former chief of staff to then-governor Bobby Jindal

Publicly expressed interest
Clay Schexnayder, Speaker of the Louisiana House of Representatives

Declined
Bill Cassidy, U.S. Senator
Garret Graves, U.S. Representative from 
John Kennedy, U.S. Senator
Billy Nungesser, Lieutenant Governor of Louisiana (running for re-election)
Mike Strain, commissioner of the Louisiana Department of Agriculture and Forestry (running for re-election)
Rick Ward III, former state senator from the 17th district

Independent candidates

Declared
Jeffery Istre, oilfield worker and U.S. Army veteran

Jungle primary

Campaign
The Louisiana Republican Party endorsed Attorney General Jeff Landry's campaign on November 7, 2022, a year before the election. The party had had a full-body meeting scheduled for October 29, but it was canceled, and instead the endorsement was voted on in an exclusive meeting held over Zoom. Landry and Eddie Rispone, a member of the Republican State Central Committee who supports him, had pushed the party to make an early endorsement, arguing that Republicans' best chance of flipping the governorship was to unite around one candidate well in advance of the election. This move was heavily criticized by other Republicans who had expressed interest in running for governor. Lieutenant Governor Billy Nungesser said the party's endorsement process "looks more like communist China than the Louisiana we know and love," State Treasurer John Schroder claimed it was driven by "money and inside party politics," and Louisiana Senate Majority Leader Sharon Hewitt proclaimed "the citizens of Louisiana do not need backroom deals and political insiders telling them who should be our next governor." Michael DiResto, a member of the Republican State Central Committee, believed "the idea that a small cabal would preempt the democratic process literally under the cover of darkness and in a smoke-filled Zoom goes against the foundational values of our party." In response, Louisiana Republican Party chair Louis Gurvich said "others who are crying over this endorsement are just upset because they didn’t have the support within our party to win the endorsement for themselves."

Endorsements

Polling

Runoff

Predictions

Polling

John Kennedy vs. Jeff Landry

Shawn Wilson vs. John Kennedy

Generic Democrat vs. generic Republican

Notes

Partisan clients

References

External links
Official campaign websites
 Sharon Hewitt (R) for Governor
 Jeff Landry (R) for Governor
 Hunter Lundy (I) for Governor
 Richard Nelson (R) for Governor
 John Schroder (R) for Governor
 Shawn Wilson (D) for Governor

2023
Gubernatorial
Louisiana